John Fahey (23 January 1928 – 18 March 2019) was an Irish Fianna Fáil politician. He was a Teachta Dála (TD) for over twenty five years.

Early life
Fahey was born in Clonmel, County Tipperary in 1928. He was educated locally at the Christian Brothers School. Following his education he worked as a farmer, an auctioneer and an insurance broker.

Politics
Fahey first entered politics in 1950 when he was elected to Waterford County Council. He held his seat on that authority until 1970, and later from 1974 to 1999.

He was elected to Dáil Éireann as a Fianna Fáil Teachta Dála (TD) for the Tipperary South constituency at the 1965 general election. It was his second attempt to get elected, having earlier contested the 1961 general election. From the 1977 general election onwards, he was elected for the Waterford constituency. He served as Parliamentary Secretary to the Minister for Agriculture and Fisheries from 1970 to 1973.

Like many other TDs, Fahey began to grow disillusioned with the leadership of Jack Lynch by the late 1970s. He and others were particularly concerned that George Colley would succeed Lynch as leader of Fianna Fáil and Taoiseach. Fahey was instrumental in forming the so-called "gang of five" with Albert Reynolds, Mark Killilea, Tom McEllistrim and Seán Doherty. This group began to lobby the Fianna Fáil parliamentary party on behalf of Charles Haughey, whom they regarded as a better choice for leader than Colley.

Haughey was the eventual winner of the leadership contest and rewarded Fahey by appointing him Minister of State at the Department of Environment, a post he held from 1979 to 1981. He was not re-appointed in any future Haughey government but remained a Haughey loyalist. Fahey contested the 1989 European Parliament election for the Munster constituency but was not elected. He was annoyed at his running mate in the constituency, and subsequently voted against the proposed Fianna Fáil–Progressive Democrats coalition; this action lost him the party whip. He re-applied for membership of the party in 1990 and was re-admitted.

Fahey lost his seat at the 1992 general election. He served out his council term on Waterford City Council, and retired from politics in 1999.

He died on 18 March 2019, aged 91.

References

1928 births
2019 deaths
Fianna Fáil TDs
Members of the 18th Dáil
Members of the 19th Dáil
Members of the 20th Dáil
Members of the 21st Dáil
Members of the 22nd Dáil
Members of the 23rd Dáil
Members of the 24th Dáil
Members of the 25th Dáil
Members of the 26th Dáil
Politicians from County Tipperary
Local councillors in County Waterford
Irish farmers
Ministers of State of the 21st Dáil
Parliamentary Secretaries of the 19th Dáil